John Franklin Mandt Jr. (born May 8, 1963) is an American businessman, politician, who formerly served as a Republican member of the West Virginia House of Delegates, representing District 16, which includes parts of Cabell and Lincoln counties. First elected in 2018, he resigned after it was reported he made homophobic remarks in a private Facebook chat. Mandt previously referred to the LGBT community as "the alphabet hate group" and called Delegate Eric Porterfield "a great guy" in response to his own anti-gay comments.

Political career

Election results

References

External links

1963 births
Living people
Discrimination against LGBT people in the United States
Republican Party members of the West Virginia House of Delegates
21st-century American politicians
Christians from West Virginia
Politicians from Huntington, West Virginia
Anti-LGBT sentiment